TITUS (German "Thesaurus Indogermanischer Text- und Sprachmaterialien" - thesaurus of Indo-European texts and languages) is a project of Johann Wolfgang Goethe University in Frankfurt am Main, maintained by Professor Dr. Jost Gippert, it aimed to collect information about Indo-European languages, and to improve collaboration between scholars.

The project aims to assist computer-related studies and to collect dictionaries, word lists, tools for linguistic analyses, etc. All contributors are given access to the materials, and some of the files can be accessed freely.

Resources 
The project provides a Unicode 4.0 font (TITUS Cyberbit Basic) and keyboard map for non-commercial purposes to match the requirements of linguists and philologists working on several languages (ancient and modern).

External links 
 TITUS project
 TITUS Cyberbit Basic font

Indo-European linguistics works